"Daydreaming" is a song by the English rock band Radiohead, produced by longtime Radiohead producer Nigel Godrich. The song is a piano ballad with strings arranged by Radiohead guitarist Jonny Greenwood. It was released as a download on 6 May 2016 as the second and final single from Radiohead's ninth studio album A Moon Shaped Pool, accompanied by a music video directed by Paul Thomas Anderson.

Recording 
"Daydreaming" was written by the band around Jonny Greenwood playing piano in a jam without singer Thom Yorke, who added the vocals and the lyrics in another session. The song was finished early in Radiohead's sessions at the La Fabrique studio in France. Yorke described it as a "breakthrough".

For the introduction, the band slowed the tape, creating a pitch-warping effect. The strings, recorded at RAK Studios in London, were arranged by guitarist Jonny Greenwood and performed by the London Contemporary Orchestra, conducted by Hugh Brunt. The orchestra had previously worked with Greenwood on his score for the 2012 film The Master. Greenwood had the cellists detune their cellos, creating a "growling" sound. Cellist Oliver Coates said: "Nigel, Jonny and Thom all have this awesome relationship, and were so animated during the recording. I remember we were laying down the cello part at the end of 'Daydreaming' and Thom said, 'That's it – that is the sound of the record.'"

Music and lyrics
"Daydreaming" is a ballad with a "simple, sad" piano motif and ambient, electronic and orchestral elements. It ends with reversed, manipulated vocals; when reversed, Yorke seems to be singing "Half of my life", "I've found my love", or "Every minute, half of my love". Several critics felt the lyrics were coloured by Radiohead singer Thom Yorke's separation from his partner of 23 years Rachel Owen. Pitchfork noted that this period was "about as long as Radiohead have been releasing music" and saw the song as a "reckoning with those years, and, in one way or another, an elegy to them".

Music video
The "Daydreaming" music video was directed by Paul Thomas Anderson, for whom Greenwood has composed several film scores. In the video, Yorke walks through a series of doors and passageways leading to various disconnected locations, including a hotel, a hospital, a laundry, and a convenience store. He eventually climbs a snowy hill, enters a cave, and mouths the song's closing words as he lies down next to a fire.

Promotion and release
"Daydreaming" was released as a download on 6 May 2016 on Radiohead's site and on streaming and digital media services. Anderson and the band sent 35 mm prints of the music video to select theatres inviting them to screen it. On 16 July 2016, Radiohead announced a fan competition to create a music video vignette for an alternative version of "Daydreaming" with additional strings.

Reception 
Pitchfork ranked "Daydreaming" the 24th best song of 2016, behind another Moon Shaped Pool track, "True Love Waits", at 9th.

Charts

References

2016 songs
Music videos directed by Paul Thomas Anderson
Radiohead songs
Song recordings produced by Nigel Godrich
Songs written by Thom Yorke
Songs written by Jonny Greenwood
Songs written by Colin Greenwood
Songs written by Ed O'Brien
Songs written by Philip Selway
XL Recordings singles